The 2010–11 Liga Leumit was the twelfth season since its introduction in 1999 and the 69th season of second-tier football in Israel. It began on 21 August 2010 and ended on 20 May 2011.

A total of sixteen teams contested the league, including twelve sides from the 2009–10 season, two promoted teams from the 2009–10 Liga Alef and two relegated teams from the 2009–10 Israeli Premier League.

Changes from 2009–10 season

Team changes
Ironi Kiryat Shmona and Hapoel Ashkelon were directly promoted to the 2010–11 Israeli Premier League after finishing the 2009–10 season in the two top places.

Maccabi Ahi Nazareth and Hapoel Ra'anana were directly relegated to the 2010–11 Liga Leumit after finishing the 2009–10 season in the bottom two places.

Overview

Stadia and locations

 The club played their home games at a neutral venue because their own ground did not meet Premier League requirements.

Regular season

Regular season table

Regular season results

Playoffs
Key numbers for pairing determination (number marks position after 30 games):

Top playoff
The points obtained during the regular season were halved (and rounded up) before the start of the playoff. Thus, Hapoel Kfar Saba started with 33 points, Ironi Ramat HaSharon with 30, Maccabi Herzliya with 27, Hapoel Rishon LeZion with 26, Hapoel Ra'anana with 23 and Sektzia Nes Tziona started with 23.

Top playoff table

Top playoff results

Middle playoff
The points obtained during the regular season were halved (and rounded up) before the start of the playoff. Thus, Hapoel Herzliya started with 23 points, Hapoel Bnei Lod with 23, Maccabi Ahi Nazareth with 17 and Beitar Shimshon Tel Aviv started with 17.

Middle playoff table

Middle playoff results

Bottom playoff
The points obtained during the regular season were halved (and rounded up) before the start of the playoff. Thus, Maccabi Be'er Sheva started with 16 points, Ironi Bat Yam with 15, Hapoel Nazareth Illit with 12, Hakoah Ramat Gan with 12, Maccabi Ironi Jatt with 10 and Ahva Arraba started with 7.

Bottom playoff table

Bottom playoff results

Promotion and Relegation playoff

Promotion playoff
The 3rd-placed Hapoel Kfar Saba faced the 14th-placed Israeli Premier League team Hapoel Petah Tikva. Hapoel Petah Tikva, the winner on aggregate earned a spot in the 2011–12 Israeli Premier League. The matches took place on May 24 and 27, 2011.

Hapoel Petah Tikva won 5–1 on aggregate.

Relegation playoff
The 14th-placed Hakoah Ramat Gan faced the 3rd-placed Liga Alef team Maccabi Kabilio Jaffa. Hakoah Ramat Gan, the winner on aggregate earned a spot in the 2011–12 Liga Leumit. The matches took place on May 26 and 31, 2011.

Hakoah Ramat Gan won 3–2 on aggregate.

Top scorers

Season statistics

Scoring
First goal of the season: Dor Elkabetz for Sektzia Nes Tziona against Ironi Bat Yam, 62nd minute (20 August 2010)
Widest winning margin: 6 goals – Hapoel Ra'anana 6–0 Ahva Arraba (30 August 2010)
Most goals in a match: 7 goals – Hakoah Ramat Gan 1–6 Hapoel Rishon LeZion (13 September 2010)

Discipline
First yellow card of the season: Yonatan Revivo for Ironi Bat Yam against Sektzia Nes Tziona, 13th minute (20 August 2010)
First red card of the season: Yonatan Revivo for Ironi Bat Yam against Sektzia Nes Tziona, 60th minute (20 August 2010)

See also
 2010–11 Israel State Cup
 2010–11 Toto Cup Leumit

References

Liga Leumit seasons
Israel
2010–11 in Israeli football leagues